Clark Glacier is in Wenatchee National Forest in the U.S. state of Washington and is on the east slopes of Clark Mountain. Clark Glacier is connected to Richardson Glacier to the west at its upper margins. Clark Glacier has also been known as Walrus Glacier.

See also
List of glaciers in the United States

References

Glaciers of the North Cascades
Glaciers of Chelan County, Washington
Glaciers of Washington (state)